Nuestra Belleza Durango 2010, was held at the 1,000-seat Centro de Convenciones, Hotel Holiday, Durango, Durango on July 1, 2010. At the conclusion of the final night of competition, Vanessa Crispín of Gómez Palacio was crowned the winner. Crispín  was crowned by outgoing Nuestra Belleza Durango titleholder, Marcela Maynez. Eight contestants competed for the state title.

Results

Placements

Special awards

Judges
Carlo Antonio Rico - Producer of Nuestra Belleza México
Paty Brogeras - Regional Cordinnator of Nuestra Belleza México
Ivonne Izcaplewsky - Televisa Representative Artists
Anabel Solis - Nuestra Belleza Mundo México 2009
Jimena Navarrete - Nuestra Belleza México 2009

Background Music
Villas del Oeste

Contestants

References

External links
Official Website

Nuestra Belleza México